Theodor "Theo" Albrecht Jr. (born 1950) is a German billionaire businessman, the owner of Trader Joe's and Aldi Nord, and the son of Aldi's co-founder. As of July 2021, Albrecht's net worth is estimated at US$20.6 billion.

Early life
Albrecht was born in Bremen, West Germany in 1950, the son of Theo Albrecht, the co-founder of the supermarket chain Aldi.

Career
In 2010, his father Theo Albrecht died, leaving the ownership of the German supermarket chain Aldi Nord and US supermarket chain Trader Joe's to his two sons, Theo Jr. and Berthold, but Berthold died in 2012. Theo Albrecht Jr. and the heirs of his brother Berthold inherited the fortune, which originally grew from a corner grocery shop opened back in 1913.

Wealth
Albrecht's estimated net worth is US$20.6 billion, as of July 2021, according to Forbes.

Personal life 
Albrecht lives in Mülheim an der Ruhr, Germany, and has one child.

References

1950 births
Living people
German billionaires
German businesspeople in retailing
20th-century German businesspeople
21st-century German businesspeople
Trader Joe's
Aldi people
Businesspeople from Bremen